Kortelisy is a village in Ukraine which was destroyed on September 23, 1942, by Germany during the Nazi invasion of the Soviet Union during World War II. Almost the entire population of Kortelisy, then amounting to 2,892 people, were killed by the German forces. The Nazis were assisted by local Ukrainian police.

The village had since been rebuilt.

Less well-known are reports that the German Army destroyed a total of 459 villages in Ukraine, killing many or all of their residents.

References

External links 
World War II in Ukraine: Kortelisy (Ukraine), Lidice (Czechoslovakia) & Oradour-sur-Glane (France): Razed Villages.
 : The Kortelisy Massacre

Nazi war crimes in Ukraine
Mass murder in 1942
Massacres in Ukraine
Razed cities